Adult Contemporary is a chart published by Billboard ranking the top-performing songs in the United States in the adult contemporary music (AC) market.  In 1993, 13 songs topped the chart, then published under the title Hot Adult Contemporary.  The chart was compiled based on playlists submitted by radio stations through the issue of Billboard dated July 10, after which a new methodology was introduced which used airplay data compiled by Nielsen Broadcast Data Systems, which provided a more accurate reflection of the spins which songs were actually receiving.

At the start of the year, Whitney Houston was at number one with "I Will Always Love You", from the soundtrack of the film The Bodyguard, in which she starred.  In the issue of Billboard dated January 23, the track was displaced from the top spot by another song from a film soundtrack, as "A Whole New World (Aladdin's Theme)" by Peabo Bryson featuring Regina Belle, from the animated film Aladdin, reached number one.  Both songs also topped the magazine's all-genre chart, the Hot 100.  Houston returned to the top of the chart with another song from The Bodyguard in May, spending two weeks at number one "I Have Nothing".  In addition to Houston, two other artists had two number ones in 1993.  Jazz saxophonist Kenny G spent two weeks at number one with "Forever in Love" and a similar length of time in the top spot with "By the Time This Night Is Over".  The latter track featured Peabo Bryson on vocals, making him another two-time chart-topper.

Following the change in the chart's methodology, songs began to experience longer runs at number one, beginning with "I Don't Wanna Fight" by Tina Turner, which spent seven consecutive weeks atop the chart.  In the issue of Billboard dated September 11, Billy Joel replaced Turner at number one with his song "The River of Dreams", which went on to spend 12 consecutive weeks at number one, breaking the record for the longest run atop the AC chart which had been held by Paul Mauriat's "Love is Blue" since 1968. Joel's song was replaced at number one by Michael Bolton's "Said I Loved You...But I Lied", which spent the final four weeks of the year in the top spot.  It would remain atop the chart for a further eight weeks in 1994, immediately tying the record set by Joel's song which had preceded it at number one.

Chart history

References

See also
1993 in music
List of artists who reached number one on the U.S. Adult Contemporary chart

1993
1993 record charts
1993 in American music